Neil Roderick Thomas MBE is a retired English artistic gymnast who experienced most of his success in the floor exercises. An acknowledged inspiration to the golden generation of British gymnasts from 2004 onwards, and a pathfinder for his national programme, he was former world silver medalist and Commonwealth Games Champion and one of the most successful British gymnasts in the history of the sport.

Career
Born in Chirk, Wrexham in Wales on 6 April 1968, Thomas was noteworthy as a successful gymnast at world and international level at a time when British gymnastics generally did not figure at that level, and is regarded as an important torchbearer in the sport for the later successes of Beth Tweddle and Louis Smith which in turn ignited, and helped secure funding for, the revolution in British gymnastics in the 2010s that saw Great Britain become a leading nation in the sport.

Winner of three gold medals spanning two Commonwealth Games, Thomas also added a world silver medal on the floor in 1993, and repeating the feat in 1994. he finished 20th at the Barcelona Olympics in  1992. Representing England he won a Commonwealth gold medal on the floor and a silver in the team competition in Auckland, New Zealand.

He also won the vault bronze medal at European Championships in 1990. In 1993 he won Great Britain's first World Championship medal in Artistic Gymnastics (silver) 1993. A year later he won a gold medal on floor and became All-around champion at the 1994 Commonwealth Games, and also won the silver medal on floor at World Championships in Brisbane.

Post-retirement and personal life
He was awarded the Member of the Order of the British Empire (MBE) in the 1995 New Year Honours for services to gymnastics and in recognition of his near single-handed achievement in putting British men's gymnastics on the map.

Following retirement, Thomas works as a development officer in the north west of England. He is a member of the Liverpool Gymnastics Club. He is cousin to TV journalist Owen Spencer-Thomas, who was also awarded the MBE.

References

External links
 

1968 births
Living people
British male artistic gymnasts
Commonwealth Games medallists in gymnastics
Commonwealth Games gold medallists for England
Commonwealth Games silver medallists for England
Commonwealth Games bronze medallists for England
Gymnasts at the 1990 Commonwealth Games
Gymnasts at the 1992 Summer Olympics
Gymnasts at the 1994 Commonwealth Games
Olympic gymnasts of Great Britain
People from Chirk
Sportspeople from Wrexham County Borough
Medalists at the World Artistic Gymnastics Championships
Members of the Order of the British Empire
Medallists at the 1990 Commonwealth Games
Medallists at the 1994 Commonwealth Games